Suitland is an island platformed Washington Metro station in Suitland, Maryland, United States. The station was opened on January 13, 2001, and is operated by the Washington Metropolitan Area Transit Authority (WMATA). Providing service for the Green Line, the station is located at Silver Hill Road and Suitland Parkway.

Groundbreaking for the final segment of the Green Line occurred on September 23, 1995, and the station opened on January 13, 2001.

Station layout
The station has an island platform located in an open cut northeast of the interchange between Suitland Parkway and Silver Hill Road. A parking garage is located east of the station.

Notable places nearby
 United States Census Bureau
 Washington National Records Center

Notes

External links

 The Schumin Web Transit Center: Suitland Station
 Station from Google Maps Street View

Stations on the Green Line (Washington Metro)
Washington Metro stations in Maryland
Railway stations in the United States opened in 2001
2001 establishments in Maryland